Saint Christopher's Church is a mediaeval Grade II listed church in Boughton Lees near Ashford, Kent, part of the Church of England.

The building was originally a mediaeval hall house. It was later a barn and the village school. In the 1950s, it was adopted as a chapel of ease.

On 13 August 1984, the Church was placed on the Statutory List of Buildings of Special Architectural or Historic Interest, as a Grade II building.

Worship 
Saint Christopher's Church is used for Sunday worship outside of the summer months (i.e. October to May). At other times, services are held at All Saints' Church, Boughton Aluph – Saint Christopher's Church is used in the non-summer months as All Saints' does not have any heating.

References 

Church of England church buildings in Kent
Diocese of Canterbury